HAUS augmin like complex subunit 6, also known as HAUS6, is a human gene.

References

Further reading